Veľký Kriváň is the highest mountain in the Lesser Fatra.

External links 

Mountains of Slovakia
Mountains of the Western Carpathians